Bridget Jones: The Edge of Reason is a 2004 romantic comedy film directed by Beeban Kidron and written by Adam Brooks, Richard Curtis, Andrew Davies, and Helen Fielding, based on Fielding's 1999 novel of the same name. It stars Renée Zellweger as Bridget Jones, Colin Firth as Mark Darcy, and Hugh Grant as Daniel Cleaver. It is the sequel to Bridget Jones's Diary (2001). The film was released in the United Kingdom on 12 November 2004 and a week later in the United States, to mixed reviews from film critics. Despite this, the film was a box office success, grossing over $260 million worldwide. Zellweger received a nomination for the Golden Globe Award for Best Actress – Motion Picture Comedy or Musical for her performance. A third film, Bridget Jones's Baby, was released in 2016.

Plot
Bridget Jones (Renée Zellweger) is ecstatic about her new relationship with Mark Darcy (Colin Firth). However, Bridget's confidence is shattered when she meets Mark's assistant, the beautiful, slim, quick-witted Rebecca Gillies (Jacinda Barrett).

At her job on the TV morning show Sit-Up Britain, Bridget crosses paths with her ex, Daniel Cleaver (Hugh Grant), and is offered a position alongside him in a new travel series. Initially refusing, she declares Daniel is a "deceitful, sexist, disgusting specimen of humanity," but eventually signs on, despite her friends' misgivings.

Bridget is delighted when Mark invites her to his "Law Council Dinner," believing he will propose afterward. However, a series of mishaps make the evening a debacle, culminating in the team trivia quiz: Bridget makes a critical error on a question about Madonna, which Rebecca Gillies wins, leaving Bridget thoroughly deflated.

After the dinner, Mark and Bridget argue and she stomps off. He goes to her apartment, apologizes, and tells her he loves her for the first time. Later that night, he invites her on a ski holiday to Lech, Austria. On the slopes, Bridget learns Rebecca is also there with a few other colleagues. She has a pregnancy scare, but after an argument over the upbringing and education of their hypothetical future children, the pregnancy test proves negative. Returning home, Bridget and Mark attend a lunch with their parents, where Bridget is hurt by Mark's dismissal of their prospective marriage.

Overhearing a message from Rebecca on Mark's answering machine, Bridget dissects it with her friends, who advise her to confront him; she does, he refuses "to dignify the question with an answer," and she breaks up with him. She travels to Thailand with Shazza (Sally Phillips) and Daniel Cleaver to film "The Smooth Guide." She and Daniel visit several exotic locations and, after Bridget accidentally consumes psilocybin mushrooms, they flirtily reconnect, but her trust in him again dissipates when a Thai prostitute he ordered appears, and she sees he has not changed.

Shazza has a fling with the much younger Jed (Paul Nicholls), who gives her a fertility snake bowl as a gift to take back to Britain, which ends up in Bridget's bag. When security dogs at the airport detect a large stash of cocaine inside it, Bridget is arrested and locked up in a Thai prison cell with almost 50 Thai female inmates. Feeling low and scared but glad at the friendliness of the inmates, she shares relationship advice with the others and teaches them to sing and dance to Madonna's "Like a Virgin."

Mark comes to tell Bridget that her release is imminent. After confirming Jed as the true perpetrator and that she "spent the night" with Daniel Cleaver, he declares her sex life does not interest him; Bridget does not correct his presumption, and he departs, leaving her sure he no longer loves her. Back in Britain, Mark confronts Daniel for abandoning Bridget in Thailand, and they fight outside an art gallery in Kensington Gardens. Daniel swears her off for good and says, "Why don't you just marry her?"

Bridget arrives at Heathrow Airport as an international human rights celebrity. Greeted by her parents, they have been busy planning their vow renewal ceremony. At home, Bridget is surprised when her friends tell her that Mark personally tracked down the drug trafficker Jed, secured his custody and extradition, and forced him to admit her innocence. Hopeful that Mark still loves her, Bridget rushes to his house. Finding Rebecca there she assumes she is romantically involved with him, but Rebecca confesses she is actually crazy about Bridget and kisses her; though flattered, she politely turns her down.

Bridget confronts Mark at his legal chambers, asking him to give her another chance. He proposes and she accepts. At the film end, her parents renew their vows and Bridget catches the bouquet.

Cast

Production

Principal photography began on 6 October 2003 and concluded on 15 February 2004.

Filming took place in Southwark and Primrose Hill. The skiing scenes took place in Lech (Vorarlberg), western Austria.

During the fight scene between Daniel and Mark at the "Serpentine Gallery in Kensington Gardens" (actually filmed in the Italian Gardens near Lancaster Gate), it was for the most part not choreographed, instead, the actors were simply asked to fight each other any way they could. At one point in the film (where Bridget and Shazzer are at the Thai airport), Bridget indulges in a fantasy of Mark coming out of water in a wet white shirt, just like Colin Firth did in the 1995 BBC version of Pride and Prejudice. The poem that Daniel quotes from while passing Ko Panyi is the story of "Phra Aphai Mani" by Sunthorn Phu.

One of the more significant differences between the novel and the film is that the film makes no mention of Bridget's fascination with the BBC television version of Jane Austen's Pride and Prejudice (Colin Firth starred in that production.)

Sandra Gregory stated that the scenes involving the Thai prison probably received inspiration from her incident since Helen Fielding knew the next door neighbors of her parents and presumably would have talked to them.

Release

Box office 
Bridget Jones: The Edge of Reason opened in the United States on a limited release on 12 November 2004 and grossed $8.7 million, at #5 at the box office; a week later, the film was given a wide release, again finishing fifth at the box office, this time with $10 million. By the end of its theatrical run, it had grossed $40.2 million domestically and $224.9 million internationally, totaling $265.1 million worldwide.

Critical response 
The film was voted Evening Standard Readers' Film of 2004, was in the shortlist for the Orange Film of the Year award at 2005 BAFTAs and the second interpretation of Bridget gained Zellweger another Golden Globe nomination and the People's Choice Award as Favorite Leading Lady of 2005.

The website's critics consensus stating: "Edge of Reason is a predictable continuation to the Bridget Jones story, with too much slapstick and silliness." Metacritic, assigned the film a weighted average score of 44 out of 100 based on 37 critics, indicating "mixed or average reviews". Audiences polled by CinemaScore gave the film an average grade of "B+" on an A+ to F scale.

Sequel

In July 2009, the BBC reported that a third film was in the early stages of production. On 1 March 2011 it was reported that both Renée Zellweger and Colin Firth had shown interest in reprising their roles. An announcement was made on 11 August 2011 that a third film was greenlit by Universal Pictures, Miramax and Working Title.

Colin Firth told The Chicago Sun Times in April 2013:

In an interview in October 2014, Hugh Grant mentioned an existing script for a sequel, however also expressed his dislike for it and that he would not star in a third film. Filming officially began on 2 October 2015. The movie opened on 16 September 2016.

Home media
The film was released on DVD and VHS on the 22nd of March 2005 with a variety of bonus features.

Soundtrack

English singer Jamelia covered "Stop" after the makers of the 2004 film Bridget Jones: The Edge of Reason approached her to record it to illustrate an integral part of the film. Jamelia instantly accepted the offer and explained how much she was a fan of the character and of the first film. The exclamation mark at the end of the title was dropped for the Jamelia release.

"Stop" was released as a double A-side with the song "DJ" on 1 November 2004. The single peaked at number nine on the UK Singles Chart and became Jamelia's fourth consecutive top-10 entry, spending 12 weeks on the chart. It also became her fourth consecutive top-40 single in Australia, peaking at number 37.

The formats of "DJ" and "Stop" received a staggered release. On 1 November 2004, the two-track CD one was released along with the "DJ" CD release. Due to time constraints, the "Stop" music video (directed by Alex Hemming) could not be added in time to make the 1 November release date and so the CD two was released a week later on 8 November 2004. This was also the first DVD single release from Jamelia. The single release also contained a cover of Wham!'s "Last Christmas".

Uncut magazine gave the album three out of five stars, saying that "[I]ts quality control is close to impeccable."  Allmusic called it "a generally enjoyable, if slick, musical counterpart to the film's frothy romantic shenanigans."

Track listing
 "Your Love Is King" by Will Young – 4:05
 "Stop" by Jamelia – 3:37
 "Can't Get You Out of My Head" by Kylie Minogue – 3:49
 "Super Duper Love" by Joss Stone – 3:50
 "Sorry Seems to Be the Hardest Word" by Mary J. Blige – 4:44
 "Misunderstood" by Robbie Williams – 4:00
 "Everlasting Love" by Jamie Cullum – 3:22
 "You're the First, the Last, My Everything" by Barry White – 3:24
 "Crazy in Love" by Beyoncé featuring Jay Z –3:56
 "I Eat Dinner (When The Hunger's Gone)" by Rufus Wainwright featuring Dido – 5:39
 "I'm Not In Love" by 10cc – 6:02
 "Nobody Does It Better" by Carly Simon – 3:44
 "Loaded" by Primal Scream – 4:32
 "Will You Still Love Me Tomorrow?" by Amy Winehouse – 3:32
 "Lovin' You" by Minnie Riperton – 3:46
 "Calling" by Leona Naess – 3:42
 "We'll Be Together" by Sting and Annie Lennox – 3:53
 "Bridget's Theme" by Harry Gregson-Williams – 2:11

Charts

Certifications

References

External links
 
 
 
 
 
 
 
 Bridget Jones Online Archive

Bridget Jones
2004 LGBT-related films
2004 romantic comedy films
2004 films
American LGBT-related films
American romantic comedy films
American sequel films
British LGBT-related films
British romantic comedy films
British sequel films
English-language French films
English-language Irish films
Films based on British novels
Films directed by Beeban Kidron
Films produced by Eric Fellner
Films produced by Tim Bevan
Films scored by Harry Gregson-Williams
Films set in Austria
Films set in London
Films set in Thailand
Films shot in Austria
Films shot in Bangkok
Films shot in London
Films shot in Rome
French LGBT-related films
French romantic comedy films
French sequel films
Irish LGBT-related films
Irish romantic comedy films
Films with screenplays by Richard Curtis
StudioCanal films
Thai-language films
Working Title Films films
Films about prostitution in Thailand
Miramax films
Universal Pictures films
2000s English-language films
2000s American films
2000s British films
2000s French films